Dott is an unincorporated community within Bethel Township in Fulton County, Pennsylvania, United States.

References

Unincorporated communities in Fulton County, Pennsylvania
Unincorporated communities in Pennsylvania